Associazione Sportiva Dilettantistica S.E.F. Tempio Pausania (formerly U.S. Tempio) is an Italian association football club located in Tempio Pausania, Sardinia. Its colours are all-blue.

The club played the 2006–07 season in Serie D/Division B, placing first and gaining promotion to Serie C2. After the regular season, Tempio took part to the Scudetto Dilettanti tournament along with the other 8 divisional champions and won it, with a 4–1 win against Neapolis in the final.

However, the club was later denied admission to Serie C2 in the 2007–08 season due to financial irregularities; they were eventually placed in the Prima Categoria league, the eighth level of Italian football, by the Sardinian Regional Committee in late August 2007.

In 2008 they were declared bankrupt and folded. A new club S.E.F. Tempio Pausania was immediately founded after Polisportiva Limbara changed name after buying Tempio's sports title.

Honours
Serie D
Winners (1): 2006–07
Eccellenza Sardinia
Winners (1): 2005–06
Prima Categoria Sardinia
Winners (1): 2008–09 (Girone D)

References

Football clubs in Italy
Football clubs in Sardinia
Serie C clubs
Italian football clubs established in 1966
Association football clubs established in 1966